Claines is a small village just to the north of Worcester, England, on the east bank of the River Severn. Claines is situated in the heart of Worcestershire on the A449 between Worcester and Kidderminster. It has a church which dates from the 10th Century.

Although not part of Claines itself the Worcester suburb of Cornmeadow Green, which is adjacent to Claines village, is generally referred to as Claines, a result of when the area was once historically part of Claines Parish prior to Worcester expanding and various administrative boundary changes many years ago. Furthermore, Claines village also falls under the Worcester City Council local government administrative area.   

Claines is known for The Mug House, one of only two pubs in a churchyard in England.

Pineau De Re, the 2014 Grand National winner, was trained at Claines and is also stabled there. The Claines village name signs were replaced by Worcestershire County Council in 2014 to recognise the win and connection to the village.

Notable people
Richard Moon (1814–1899) Chairman of the London and North Western Railway from June 1861 until he retired on 22 February 1891. He lived in Bevere, a small hamlet on the banks of the River Severn, in Claines parish from 1849 to 1863. At the vestry meeting on 24 April 1851 he was elected as Vicar's Churchwarden.
Cricketer Edward Rowlands (1826-1860) was born here.

References

External links

Victoria County History: Claines Parish
Claines war memorial
Friends of Claines Church
The Mug House

Villages in Worcestershire
Geography of Worcester, England